Kerry are by far the most successful team in the history of Gaelic football. They have won 38 All-Ireland Senior Football Championship and have appeared in countless other All-Ireland Football Finals. Kerry footballers have been garlanded with countless awards and hold numerous individual records in the sport. Pat Spillane received nine All Stars during a glittering career, a feat matched by no other Gaelic footballer, while Tadhg Kennelly is the only holder of both an AFL Premiership medallion and a Senior All-Ireland Championship medal, the highest possible achievement in the sports of Australian rules football and Gaelic football. Here are Kerry's honours.

Gaelic football
All Irelands (92)

All-Ireland Senior Football Championships: 38
1903, 1904, 1909, 1913, 1914, 1924, 1926, 1929, 1930, 1931, 1932, 1937, 1939, 1940, 1941, 1946, 1953, 1955, 1959, 1962, 1969, 1970, 1975, 1978, 1979, 1980,  1981, 1984, 1985, 1986, 1997, 2000, 2004, 2006, 2007, 2009, 2014,  2022
All-Ireland Under-21 Football Championships: 10
1964, 1973, 1975, 1976, 1977, 1990, 1995, 1996, 1998, 2008
All-Ireland Minor Football Championships: 16
1931, 1932, 1933, 1946, 1950, 1962, 1963, 1975, 1980, 1988, 1994, 2014, 2015, 2016, 2017, 2018
All-Ireland Junior Football Championships: 20
 1913, 1915, 1924, 1928, 1930, 1941, 1949, 1954, 1963, 1967, 1983, 1991, 1994, 2006, 2012, 2015, 2016, 2017, 2018, 2019
All-Ireland Vocational Schools Championships: 9
 1973, 1977, 1978, 1986, 1987, 1990, 1992, 1993, 1997

League Titles (23)

National Football Leagues: 23
1928, 1929, 1931, 1932, 1959, 1961, 1963, 1969, 1971, 1972, 1973, 1974, 1977, 1982, 1984, 1997, 2004, 2006, 2009, 2017, 2020, 2021, 2022
National Football Leagues Div 2: 1
2002

Regional

Provincials (216)

Munster Senior Football Championships: 83
1892, 1903, 1904, 1905, 1908, 1909, 1910, 1912, 1913, 1914, 1915, 1919, 1923, 1924, 1925, 1926, 1927, 1929, 1930, 1931, 1932, 1933, 1934, 1936, 1937, 1938, 1939, 1940, 1941, 1942, 1944, 1946, 1947, 1948, 1950, 1951, 1953, 1954, 1955, 1958, 1959, 1960, 1961, 1962, 1963, 1964, 1965, 1968, 1969, 1970, 1972, 1975, 1976, 1977, 1978, 1979, 1980, 1981, 1982, 1984, 1985, 1986, 1991, 1996, 1997, 1998, 2000, 2001, 2003, 2004, 2005, 2007, 2010, 2011, 2013, 2014, 2015, 2016, 2017, 2018, 2019, 2021, 2022
Munster Under-21/Under-20 Football Championships: 28 (Under 20 since 2018) 
1962, 1964, 1966, 1967, 1968, 1972, 1973, 1975, 1976, 1977, 1978, 1983, 1987, 1988, 1990, 1991, 1992, 1993, 1995, 1996, 1997, 1998, 1999, 2002, 2008, 2017, 2018, 2020
Munster Minor Football Championships: 49
1931, 1932, 1933, 1936, 1937, 1938, 1940, 1941, 1945, 1946, 1947, 1948, 1949, 1950, 1951, 1954, 1957, 1958, 1962, 1963, 1965, 1970, 1975, 1978, 1979, 1980, 1982, 1988, 1989, 1990, 1994, 1996, 1997, 1998, 2001, 2002, 2003, 2004, 2006,2008, 2009, 2013, 2014, 2015, 2016, 2017, 2018, 2019, 2020
Munster Junior Football Championships: 46
1913, 1914, 1915, 1924, 1926, 1927, 1928, 1930, 1931, 1934, 1936, 1938, 1941, 1946, 1947, 1949, 1954, 1956, 1958, 1959, 1960, 1961, 1963, 1965, 1967, 1968, 1969, 1983, 1985, 1991, 1994, 1995, 1997, 2000, 2002, 2003, 2006, 2008, 2010, 2012, 2014, 2015, 2016, 2017, 2018, 2019
Munster Football League: 1
1926
McGrath Cup: 6
1996, 2010, 2011, 2013, 2017, 2022
Dr Croke Cup: 1
1906
Croke Memorial Tournament: 1
1913
Railway Cup Football: 2
1927 (all Kerry players), 1931 (all Kerry players)

(Note that the Railway Cup is contested by provincial sides - these are years in which the Munster team consisted entirely of Kerry players).

Individual

Players who won eight All-Ireland SFC medals (5)

GAA All Stars Awards (148)

Texaco Footballer of the Year wins (18)
The following Kerry players were named Texaco Footballer of the Year:

1959: Seán Murphy
1962: Mick O'Connell
1969: Mick O'Dwyer
1979: Tom Prendergast
1975: John O'Keeffe
1978: Pat Spillane
1979: Mikey Sheehy1980: Jack O'Shea1981: Jack O'Shea2nd1984: Jack O'Shea3rd1985: Jack O'Shea4th1986: Pat Spillane2nd1997: Maurice Fitzgerald2000: Seamus Moynihan2004: Colm Cooper2006: Kieran Donaghy2007: Marc Ó Sé2009: Paul Galvin2014: James O'Donoghue

Team of the Millennium (6)
The following Kerry players were among the fifteen selected for the Football Team of the Millennium:

 Dan O'Keeffe (goalkeeper)
 Joe Keohane (full-back)
 Seán Murphy (right half-back)
 Mick O'Connell (midfielder)
 Pat Spillane (left half-forward)
 Mikey Sheehy (right corner-forward)

Team of the Century (6)
The following Kerry players were among the fifteen selected for the Football Team of the Century in 1984:

 Dan O'Keeffe (goalkeeper)
 Seán Murphy (right half-back)
 Jack O'Shea (midfielder)
 Mick O'Connell (midfielder)
 Pat Spillane (left half-forward)
 Mikey Sheehy (right corner-forward)

Ladies' football
 All-Ireland Senior Ladies' Football Championships: 11
1976, 1982, 1983, 1984, 1985, 1986, 1987, 1988, 1989, 1990, 1993
 All-Ireland Under-18 Ladies' Football Championship: 3
1980, 1981, 1995
 All-Ireland Under-16 Ladies' Football Championship: 1
1999
 All-Ireland Under-14 Ladies' Football Championship: 5
1991, 1992, 1993, 1999, 2008

Hurling
 All-Ireland Senior Hurling Championships: 1
1891
 All-Ireland Senior B Hurling Championships: 3
1976, 1983, 1986
 Christy Ring Cup: 2
2011, 2015
 All-Ireland Under 21 B Hurling Championships: 9
2001, 2002, 2006, 2009, 2010, 2011, 2013, 2017, 2018, 2019
 All Ireland Minor B Hurling Championships: 10
1997, 2000, 2001, 2006, 2009, 2012, 2013, 2014, 2015, 2016
 All-Ireland Junior Hurling Championship: 2
1961, 1972National Hurling Leagues Division 2: 7
1957, 1962, 1967, 1968, 1979, 1998, 2001National Hurling Leagues Division 2A: 2
2014, 2015National Hurling Leagues Division 3: 1
1989National Hurling Leagues Division 3A: 1
2010
 Munster Senior Hurling Championships: 1
1891
 Munster Junior Hurling Championships: 1
1956
 Munster Intermediate Hurling Championships: 2
1970, 1973
 Leinster Minor B Hurling Championships:' 2
1987, 1988

Notable hurlers
Michael ‘Boxer’ Slattery
Shane Brick
Brendan O'Sullivan
John Mike Dooley
John Healy
John Mahony
Tom Collins
Maurice Leahy
Christy Walsh

Camogie
A selected Kerry team won divisional honours at Féile na nGael in 2008, 2009 and 2010. 
Notable players include Mary Geaney.

Other
Other notable achievements include:

 Pat Spillane, recipient of nine All Stars during a glittering career, a feat matched by no other Gaelic footballer.
 Tadhg Kennelly, the world's only holder of both an AFL Premiership medallion and a Senior All-Ireland Championship medal, the highest possible achievement in the sports of Australian rules football and Gaelic football.

References

External links
 Vintage Kerry GAA Jerseys from Retro GAA
 Kerry on Hoganstand.com
 National and provincial titles won by Kerry teams
 Club championship winners
 Kerry GAA site
 Causeway GAA site Hurling club from North Kerry

Honours